Ulg is an album by Estonian folk metal group Metsatöll. The English translation of the word "Ulg" is "the howl".

Reception
The album was generally well received.

Track listing

Members
 Markus "Rabapagan" Teeäär – vocals, guitar
 Lauri "Varulven" Õunapuu – vocals, guitar, flutes, torupill (Estonian bagpipes) & other traditional instruments 
 Raivo "KuriRaivo" Piirsalu – bass and vocals 
 Marko Atso – drums and vocals

References
http://www.metsatoll.ee/en/muusika/ulg.html
http://www.metalpsalter.com/review_metsatoll_ulg.html

2011 albums
Metsatöll albums